The Smart Money Woman is a Nigerian TV series based on a 2016 novel of the same name by Arese Ugwu. The series premiered on Africa Magic Showcase in September 2020. The series was filmed to exclusively dramatise the novel. The series which initially aired as a single season of 13 episodes on Africa magic was released on Netflix as a single season with 7 episodes on Netflix on 16 September 2021. It was executively produced by the writer of the novel, Arese Ugwu and produced by Kemi Lala Akindoju. It starred Osas Ighodaro, Timini Egbuson, Ini Dima-Okojie, Kemi Lala Akindoju and many others.

Plot summary 
The Smart Money Woman revolves around five young women and how they take control of their finances and assets, the series focuses on spending culture of women and how it ultimately affects their finances on the long run, the series also talks about how friendship, peer pressure and societal influence can affect how we spend money, It also features and teaches how women should learn to invest in their themselves amidst romantic and financial losses. it also has some addendum quotes on how to become a smart money woman and also discusses challenges women face with societal pressure and desire to meet up with standards.

Episodes

Selected cast 
Osas Ighodaro as Zuri
Kemi Lala Akindoju as Adesuwa
Toni Tones as Lara
Ebenezer Eno as Ladun
Eku Edewor as Banke
Timini Egbuson as Bobby
Ini Dima-Okojie as Tami
Seun Ajayi as Soji
Nonso Bassey as Olumide Sanni

Awards and nominations

References

2020s Nigerian television series
2020 Nigerian television series debuts